April Wade is an American actress, film producer and screenwriter.

Wade is best known for films and television series such as April Showers, Happy Endings, Creepshow III, Day of the Dead 2: Contagium, Opie Gets Laid and Junction.

References

External links
 
 

American film producers
American screenwriters
American film actresses
American television actresses
American stage actresses
Living people
Year of birth missing (living people)
21st-century American actresses
American women film producers